FC ViOn Zlaté Moravce – Vráble B is a Slovak football team, based in the town of Vráble. The club was founded in 1919. The club is reserve team of FC ViOn Zlaté Moravce – Vráble.

Current squad 
Updated 2 September 2018

External links 

  

ViOn Zlate Moravce - Vrable B